NGC 2371-2 is a dual lobed planetary nebula located  in the constellation Gemini.  Visually, it appears like it could be two separate objects; therefore, two entries were given to the planetary nebula by John Louis Emil Dreyer in the New General Catalogue, so it may be referred to as NGC 2371, NGC 2372, or variations on this name. It has also been called the double bubble nebula.

The central star of the planetary nebula has a spectral type of [WO1], indicating a spectrum similar to that of an oxygen-rich Wolf–Rayet star.

Observations 
NGC 2371-2 is in the constellation of Gemini which is visible in the latitudes between +90° and −60°. The planetary nebula appears southwest of Castor, and is located at a distance of 4400 light years.

At 13th magnitude, this nebula is well within the limits of most amateur telescopes.  Like most planetary nebulae, this one responds well to both high magnification and narrow-band filters, especially an OIII emission filter.  It is listed within the RASC's 110 Finest NGC List.

Gallery

See also
Gemini in Chinese astronomy
 Cancer Minor (constellation) - Obsolete constellation inside modern Gemini

References

External links 

 The Hubble European Space Agency Information Centre Hubble picture and information on NGC 2371
 

Planetary nebulae
Gemini (constellation)
2371